Petrolia may refer to:

United States
 Petrolia, New York
 Petrolia, California
 Petrolia, Kansas
 Petrolia, Pennsylvania
 Petrolia, Texas
 Petrolia Formation

Canada
 Petrolia, Ontario

Venezuela
 Petrolia del Tachira, first private oil company of Venezuela